This is a list of the episodes from the second season of the anime series Nintama Rantarō.

Episode list

Notes

References

1994 Japanese television seasons
1995 Japanese television seasons
Nintama Rantarō episode lists